Platyrhinini is a tribe of fungus weevils in the beetle family Anthribidae. There are at least 3 genera and more than 40 described species in Platyrhinini.

Genera
These three genera belong to the tribe Platyrhinini:
 Goniocloeus Jordan, 1904
 Trachitropis
 Trachytropis Jordan, 1904

References

Further reading

 
 
 
 
 

Anthribidae
Articles created by Qbugbot